Thomas Raymond Martin (born October 16, 1947) is a Canadian retired professional ice hockey player. Martin played in three National Hockey League (NHL) games with the Toronto Maple Leafs during the 1967–68 season. He also played in over 200 WHA games with the Ottawa Nationals and Toronto Toros between 1972 and 1975.

Career statistics

Regular season and playoffs

External links
 

1947 births
Living people
Canadian expatriate ice hockey players in Sweden
Canadian expatriate ice hockey players in the United States
Canadian ice hockey right wingers
Fort Worth Wings players
Ice hockey people from Toronto
Modo Hockey players
National Hockey League first-round draft picks
Ontario Hockey Association Senior A League (1890–1979) players
Ottawa Nationals players
Tidewater Wings players
Toronto Maple Leafs draft picks
Toronto Maple Leafs players
Toronto Marlboros players
Toronto Toros players
Tulsa Oilers (1964–1984) players